Verkhny At-Uryakh is an urban locality (an urban-type settlement) in Yagodninsky District of Magadan Oblast, Russia. Population:

References

Urban-type settlements in Magadan Oblast